The 2001–02 season was FK Partizan's 10th season in First League of Serbia and Montenegro. This article shows player statistics and all matches (official and friendly) that the club played during the 2001–02 season.

Players

Squad information
 Radovan Radaković
 Vuk Rašović
 Dragoljub Jeremić
 Igor Duljaj
 Dejan Ognjanović
 Milan Stojanoski
 Goran Trobok
 Andrija Delibašić
 Zvonimir Vukić
 Damir Čakar
 Miladin Bečanović
 Radiša Ilić
 Nenad Mišković
 Ivan Stanković
 Aleksandar Nedović
 Ivica Iliev
 Vladimir Ivić
 Ajazdin Nuhi
 Saša Ilić
 Dejan Rusmir
 Branko Savić
 Branimir Bajić
 Ljubiša Ranković
 Milan Milijaš
 Milivoje Ćirković
 Danko Lazović
 Đorđe Pantić

Competitions

First League of FR Yugoslavia

League table

FR Yugoslavia Cup

UEFA Cup

Qualifying round

First round

See also
 List of FK Partizan seasons
 Partizanopedia 2001-2002  (in Serbian)

References

External links

FK Partizan seasons
Partizan
Serbian football championship-winning seasons